The Recreation, Intramural, and Athletic Complex (RIMAC) is a sports complex at the University of California San Diego comprising an arena, a weight room and various other event and athletic facilities. It is one of the largest college athletic facilities in the country. LionTree Arena  is the home arena of the UC San Diego Tritons men's and women's basketball, volleyball, and fencing teams, and Triton Soccer Stadium on the adjacent RIMAC Field hosts Triton men's and women's soccer matches.

History 
In 1990, UC San Diego proposed a fee increase of $70 per student to fund a new athletic and event complex. Advocates of the project argued that the existing Main Gym did not have enough aerobic or weight-lifting space to support a rapidly growing university. In addition, Main Gym only seated 2,200 and was rarely available for concerts. The referendum narrowly passed with 51% of the votes, but the results were contested for years.

In September 1991, the Regents of the University of California approved a $33.5 million design by Parkin Architects for the proposed complex, which was architecturally similar to the existing Price Center. Construction began in December 1992, and the facility was completed in December 1994. Upon its completion, RIMAC was the largest NCAA Division III athletic complex in the country and remains one of the largest among all universities. The complex was inaugurated by First Lady Hillary Rodham Clinton's speech dedicating the newly-named Eleanor Roosevelt College.

Since 2011, the facilities have been run by the Director of Event Management Marc Beasley.

In 2015, RIMAC was LEED-silver certified by the U.S. Green Building Council.

UC San Diego announced on June 16, 2022 that RIMAC Arena has been renamed LionTree Arena in recognition of a $5 million gift for scholar-athletes.

Arena building 

RIMAC Arena is the name used to refer to the 186,000 square foot building that houses both the home arena of the Tritons and the adjacent auxiliary gym. The 44,000 square foot arena itself stands 52 feet tall (45 feet from floor to rafters) and contains six dressing rooms and a 60-by-40-foot-stage, among other facilities. It seats 4,200 spectators in the bleachers for Triton basketball and volleyball home games, expandable to 5,000 through the use of floor seats for concerts. Curtains can divide the facility into five basketball courts that use Robbins Bio-Cushion I flooring. The floor space can also be used for conventions, concerts, trade shows, and other events. In the past, it has hosted training camps for the National Basketball Association's Phoenix Suns, Los Angeles Clippers, and Sacramento Kings. Since 2011, concerts have been exclusively booked by Nederlander Concerts.

The auxiliary gym accommodates two additional basketball or volleyball courts, as well as three mirrored activity rooms, two squash courts, eight racquetball courts, a wellness center, a pro shop, two conference rooms, and two locker rooms. It also contains a 12,000 square foot weight and fitness room, which was the highest priority for students upon construction. This supplements the original UCSD Main Gym weight room, as well as the subsequently constructed Spanos Training Facility and Canyonview Aquatic Center. A 3,000 square foot pit can be reserved for athletic teams.

Field 
RIMAC Field is an 11.8-acre Santa Ana Grass field located immediately northeast of RIMAC Arena. The field is used for NCAA, club, and intramural athletic events, as well as the UC San Diego convocation and commencement ceremonies. It can be divided into five regulation soccer fields or adapted for concerts and music festivals. Previously, it was used by the San Diego Chargers as their training camp facility.

UC San Diego's annual Sun God Festival is held on RIMAC Field. The festival, which features two concert stages and various attractions, typically approaches the field's maximum attendance of 20,000. Like those at RIMAC Arena, outside concerts on RIMAC Field have been exclusively booked by Nederlander Concerts since 2011.

Triton Soccer Stadium 
For NCAA soccer games, a western section of RIMAC Field is cordoned off by temporary fences to create a regulation-sized soccer pitch. Permanent stone bleachers on the west side of the stadium allow a maximum capacity of 750, which can be expanded to 1,750 through the use of temporary bleachers for NCAA postseason fixtures. A commentary and scoring table is usually erected opposite the bleachers between the two teams' benches. The UC San Diego men's and women's soccer teams play their home games here.

Triton Softball Field 

The regulation-sized UC San Diego softball field is located just south of Triton Soccer Stadium. It is usually separated from the rest of RIMAC Field by a fence that measures 220 feet from home plate. In 2008, the school spent $8.6 million to expand the bleachers, improve the dugouts and field, and add a press box.

RIMAC Annex 

RIMAC was originally planned to include more conference-room space, dining facilities, additional hot tubs, saunas, a rock-climbing center, and an outdoor resource center. Budget controversies forced the university to postpone many of these plans. In 2005, discussion reopened regarding the expansion of RIMAC's facilities to keep up with growing student demand, but these plans were again postponed. Finally, in 2008, construction began on RIMAC Annex, a 10,000-square-foot building located adjacent to RIMAC Arena. The $10 million building was completed September 2009.

RIMAC Annex opened with several meeting spaces and study lounges, a convenience store, and a Peet's Coffee and Tea. A sports bar opened shortly afterwards.

See also 
 List of NCAA Division I basketball arenas

References

External links 
 UCSD Sports Facilities

UC San Diego Tritons basketball
College basketball venues in the United States
Indoor arenas in California
Sports venues in San Diego
Basketball venues in California
Convention centers in California
University of California, San Diego
1995 establishments in California
Sports venues completed in 1995
College soccer venues in California